Rimah Governorate (sometimes pronounced as Rumah or Romah) is one of the governorates of Riyadh Province. It is located about 120 kilometers north-east of Riyadh City, and bounded on the north-east by Eastern Province, on the South by Riyadh, and on the West by Majma'ah, Thadig, and Huraimila.

Area 
The area of Rimah Governorate is about 15900 km2.

Population 

The population of Rimah is about 30000. And characterized by conservative areas spring, including: 
 Rawdhat Khuraim. 
 Rawdhat Altneah.

Villages of Rumah 
The following 23 administrative centers (villages) are under the governorate of Rumah:
 Asamlh Center
 Almejfliah Center
 Aljamalin Center
 Faraj Center
 Alozma Center
 Al Ghurair Center
 Shelash Center
 Albledan Center
 Ar Rumahiyah Center
 Afaihanah Center
 Hafr Alach Center
 Shuih Center
 Almazira Center
 Agheilana Center
 Alaatalah Center
 Omani Centre
 Saad Center
 Center handful
 Al Ali Center
 Aujan Center
 Beni Amer Center
 Center Albany
 Ela Center

Government Departments in Rimah 
 Police station
 Municipality
 Court
 Notaries
 Delegation of girls' education
 Office of educational supervision for girls
 Saudi Post
 Civil Status
 Office guidance for Boys
 Committee for the Promotion of Virtue and the Prevention of Vice (Saudi Arabia)
 Division passports and follow-up entrants
 Electricity Company
 Veterinary unit
 General hospital
 Health center
 Civil defense center
 Saudi Telecom Company
 Birr Charity Society
 Association Koran
 Public market
 College of Science and Humanities
 Private School (Arabic)
Panda, Othaim
Forsan Private School (Arabic)

References 
http://www.riyadh.gov.sa/RiyadhPlaceProvinces.asp?Prov=15

Governorates of Saudi Arabia